Zapod is a village and a former municipality in Kukës County, northeastern Albania. At the 2015 local government reform it became a subdivision of the municipality Kukës. The administrative unit of Zapod contains the villages of Orgjost, Kosharisht, Pakisht, Zapod and Orçikël which are populated by Slavic Muslims, called Gorani, who speak Torlakian (Gora dialect), while the villages of Bele and Lojmë are inhabited by Albanians. As of the 2011 census, the municipality had 2,217 residents, of whom 80% declared as ethnic Albanians and 11.7% declared as ethnic Macedonians.

References

Gorani people
Former municipalities in Kukës County
Administrative units of Kukës
Villages in Kukës County
Macedonian communities in Albania